Dragomirești is a commune in Neamț County, Western Moldavia, Romania. It is composed of six villages: Borniș, Dragomirești, Hlăpești, Mastacăn, Unghi and Vad.

References

Communes in Neamț County
Localities in Western Moldavia